House Flipper is a simulation game developed by Frozen District and published by PlayWay S.A. for macOS, Windows, PlayStation 4, Xbox One, and Nintendo Switch. It was initially released on 17 May 2018. A mobile version, entitled House Flipper: Home Design was released for Android and iOS in October 2020.

Gameplay 
Gameplay involves fixing up properties in order to create a profit. Tasks that can be performed include painting, laying down tiles, cleaning, installations, and demolition. Players can fix and personalize their own homes, fix houses in quests and buy houses to fix and sell.

Reception 

House Flipper received "mixed or average reviews" according to review aggregator Metacritic, with multiple reviewers commenting that fixing up the homes is satisfying while questioning its long-term playability. Kotaku reviewed the game, stating that they found it satisfying to fix up homes that are "often extremely gross or ugly" and that "Manifesting your vision of a decent, sellable house onto these garbage heaps feels amazing—especially because it happens on such a granular scale." Game Informer was more mixed, writing that "Flipping your first few houses is fun, but the game doesn't have the scope or flexibility to stay interesting for long". PC Gamer was critical, stating that "There's a definite satisfaction in taking a gross room and making it look nice, and it's pretty cool that you can knock down (and rebuild) walls, but I just don't find the act of slowly and mechanically painting and cleaning much fun, especially with the knowledge that my actual house could do with a bit of that." It became a bestseller on Steam.

Awards 
The game was nominated for "Game, Simulation" at the National Academy of Video Game Trade Reviewers Awards. House Flipper was also awarded Poznań Game Arena Best Polish Indie Game of 2018.

Downloadable content 
Together with the base game, on 17 May 2018, a free Apocalypse Flipper DLC was released. The player receives more items and 5 new properties that can be bought.

On 16 May 2019, the Garden Flipper DLC was released. This allows the player to apply renovations to the gardens of properties. The player can then participate in the garden competitions where their work will be evaluated and given a score. The property can then be sold at a higher price depending on the score that was achieved.

On 14 May 2020, the HGTV DLC was released. This DLC features new jobs, items, gameplay-mechanics and properties that can be bought. The latter requires the player to first complete the corresponding jobs.

On 19 November 2020, a new free Cyberpunk Flipper DLC was released. The DLC adds a new property for renovation and a set of props, all centered around the cyberpunk theme.

In 2021, PlayWay announced two additional DLCs; the Pets DLC is centered around adopting and keeping pets such as dogs and cats, while the Luxury Flipper DLC, released in late 2021, is based around renovating expensive modern and old houses in a new town - Moonrise Bay.

References

External links
 

2018 video games
Business simulation games
Construction and management simulation games
MacOS games
Nintendo Switch games
PlayStation 4 games
PlayWay games
Single-player video games
Video games developed in Poland
Video games with Steam Workshop support
Windows games
Xbox One games